Saint Jacob Netsvetov (Russian: Яков (Иаков) Егорович Нецветов), Enlightener of Alaska, was a native of the Aleutian Islands who became a priest of the Orthodox Church and continued the missionary work of St. Innocent among his and other Alaskan people. His feast day is celebrated on the day of his repose, July 26.

Early life
Netsvetov was born Jacob Netsvetov in 1802, on Atka Island, part of the Aleutian Island chain in Alaska.  He was the eldest child of four that survived infancy, born to Yegor Vasil'evich Netsvetov from Tobolsk, Russia, and Maria Alekscevna, an Aleut from Atka Island. His father was a manager for the Russian-American Company. His surviving siblings were, in order of age, Osip (Joseph), Elena, and Antony. Netsvetov enrolled in the Irkutsk Theological Seminary at an early age. Osip and Antony were enrolled in the St. Petersburg Naval Academy and became a naval officer and a ship builder respectively. His sister Elena married a clerk from the Russian-American Company.

Missionary work
On October 1, 1825, Netsvetov was tonsured a sub-deacon. He married Anna Simeonovna, a Russian woman perhaps of a Creole background, as was he, and in 1826 he graduated from the seminary with certificates in history and theology. With graduation he was ordained a deacon on October 31, 1826, and assigned to the Holy Trinity-St. Peter Church in Irkutsk. Two years later, Archbishop Michael ordained Netsvetov to the holy priesthood on March 4, 1828. Netsvetov was the first native Alaskan to be ordained to the priesthood. Archbishop Michael had earlier ordained John Veniaminov (St. Innocent) to the priesthood. With his elevation to the priesthood, Netsvetov began to yearn to return to his native Alaska to preach the Word of God.

Upon departing, Archbishop Michael gave Netsvetov two antimensia, one for use in the new church that Netsvetov planned to build on Atka, and the other for use in Netsvetov's missionary travels. After a molieben, Netsvetov and his party set off for Alaska on May 1, 1828. The travellers included Netsvetov, his wife Anna, and his father Yegor who had been tonsured as a reader for the new Atka Church. This journey took over a year to complete, and they arrived in Atka on June 15, 1829.

Netsvetov’s new Atka Parish covered most of the islands and land surrounding the Bering Sea, including Amchitka, Attu, Copper, Bering, and Kurile Islands. Netsvetov was both bilingual and bicultural, which helped him establish himself in a diverse community.

While the St. Nicolas Church was under construction, Netsvetov used a large tent to hold services, and he continued to use the tent after the church was completed, in order to preach in remote locations. By the end of 1829, six months after arriving at Akta, Netsvetov had recorded 16 baptisms, 442 chrismations, 53 marriages, and eight funerals.

With the completion of the church on Atka, Netsvetov turned to education of the children, teaching them to read and write both Russian and Unangan Aleut. Initially the Russian-American Company helped support the school, but in 1841 the school was re-organized as a parish school. Many of his students would later become Aleut leaders. Netsvetov also helped in collecting and preparing fish and marine animal specimens for the museums in Moscow and St. Petersburg. He corresponded with St Innocent on linguistics and translation matters. He worked on an Unangan-Aleut alphabet, translations of the Holy Scriptures, and other church publications. In addition to praises from St. Innocent he began to receive awards for his services. In time he was elevated to Archpriest and received the Order of St. Anna.

Netsvetov’s wife Anna died in March 1836, and his home was destroyed in a fire in July of the same year. His father, Yegor, also died in 1837. After these events he petitioned his bishop in order to return to Irkutsk and enter a monastic life, a request that was approved a year later contingent on the arrival of his replacement. However, the church did not provide a replacement.

On December 30, 1844, St. Innocent appointed him head of the new Kvikhpak Mission along the Yukon River. With his nephew Vasili Netsvetov and two young Creole assistants, Innokentii Shayashnikov and Konstantin Lukin, Netsvetov established his headquarters in the Yup'ik village of Ikogmiute. From there, now known as the Russian Mission, he travelled hundreds of miles along the Yukon and Kuskokwim Rivers, visiting the inhabitants of settlements along the way. For the next twenty years he learned new languages, met new people and cultures, invented another alphabet, and built more churches and communities. At the invitation of the native leaders, he travelled as far as the Innoko River, baptizing hundreds from many formerly hostile tribes. He continued even as his health deteriorated.

An assistant lodged spurious and slanderous charges against him in 1863. To clear the air his Bishop Peter called him to Sitka where he was cleared of all the charges. As his health worsened, he remained in Sitka serving at the Tlingit chapel until his death on July 26, 1864. He was 60 years old. Netsvetov was buried at the entrance to the chapel.

During his last missionary travels in the Kuskokwim/Yukon delta region he is remembered for baptizing 1,320 people and for distinguishing himself as the evangelizer of the Yup'ik and Athabascan peoples.

See also
 Patriarch Tikhon of Moscow
 Herman of Alaska
 Alexis Toth
 Anatole Kamensky
 Seraphim of Uglich
 Bogoljub Gakovich
 Teofan Beatovich
 Varnava Nastić
 Justin Popovich
 Peter the Aleut
 List of American Eastern Orthodox saints

References

Sources
 Holy Synod of Bishops OCA, The Life of Saint Jacob Netsvetov, Oyster Bay Cove, New York, March 1994.

External links
The Life of Saint Jacob Netsvetov
Alaskan Orthodox texts (Aleut, Yup'ik) by St. Jacob Netsvetov

Alaskan Creole people
1802 births
1864 deaths
19th-century Christian saints
Alaska Native people
American saints of the Eastern Orthodox Church
Eastern Orthodoxy in Alaska
Russian Empire saints